Penthilus (Ancient Greek: Πένθιλος) is the illegitimate or legitimate son of half-siblings Orestes and Erigone in Greek mythology.

Family 
Penthilus' grandmother was Clytemnestra. His maternal and paternal grandfathers were Aigisthos and Agamemnon respectively. Penthilus fathered two sons, Echelatus (Echelas or Archelaüs), and Damasias (Damasius), father of Agorius.

Mythology 
Orestes killed both Clytemnestra, who was his own mother and Aigisthos. Erigone is said to have hanged herself or married Orestes after the latter's first wife, Hermione, died. Orestes was ruler over much of the Peloponnese and died of a snakebite at age 70. One story says that as a child, Penthilus was torn apart and devoured by wolves in the Taygetus mountains, near Sparta. His father established a festival of mourning, the so-called Penthilia in his honour.

According to Pausanias, Penthilus grew up and founded a city either on Lesbos or in Thrace. Penthilus was the mythical ancestor of the Penthilides, an ancient dynasty of kings on Lesbos. His son, Echelas was the father of Gras, the founder of the city Aeolis, between Ionia and Mysia. In some accounts, Penthilus instead led a colony of Aeolians to Thrace.

Notes

References 

 Apollodorus, The Library with an English Translation by Sir James George Frazer, F.B.A., F.R.S. in 2 Volumes, Cambridge, MA, Harvard University Press; London, William Heinemann Ltd. 1921. ISBN 0-674-99135-4. Online version at the Perseus Digital Library. Greek text available from the same website.
 Pausanias, Description of Greece with an English Translation by W.H.S. Jones, Litt.D., and H.A. Ormerod, M.A., in 4 Volumes. Cambridge, MA, Harvard University Press; London, William Heinemann Ltd. 1918. . Online version at the Perseus Digital Library
 Pausanias, Graeciae Descriptio. 3 vols. Leipzig, Teubner. 1903.  Greek text available at the Perseus Digital Library.
 Strabo, The Geography of Strabo. Edition by H.L. Jones. Cambridge, Mass.: Harvard University Press; London: William Heinemann, Ltd. 1924. Online version at the Perseus Digital Library.
 Strabo, Geographica edited by A. Meineke. Leipzig: Teubner. 1877. Greek text available at the Perseus Digital Library.

Characters in Greek mythology
Mythology of the Peloponnese